The list of honorary doctors of the University of Waikato below shows the recipients of honorary doctorates bestowed by the University of Waikato since its foundation in 1964.

References 

 
Lists of New Zealand people
Waikato
New Zealand education-related lists